The Mong Circle is one of three hereditary chiefdoms (or "circles") in the Chittagong Hill Tracts of modern-day Bangladesh. The jurisdiction of the Mong Circle encompasses parts of Khagrachhari District. The chiefdom's members are of Marma descent and are known as phalansa. Most inhabitants of the Mong Circle settled in the northwest during a migration wave from the Kingdom of Mrauk U (modern-day Arakan State in Myanmar) between the 16th and 18th centuries, while inhabitants of the other Marma chiefdom, the Bohmong Circle settled in the south and are known as ragraisa.

Leadership 
The Mong Circle is led by a hereditary chieftain called a "raja." The Mong chieftains appoint and oversee headmen called mouza and village chiefs called karbaris. The incumbent chieftain is Saching Prue (b. 1988) of the Chowdhury house; he formally ascended the throne on 17 January 2009. His predecessor, Paihala Prue Chowdhury, died in a roadside car accident on 22 October 2008.

History 
The Mong Circle dates to 1782 with the first chieftain, Mrachai. During British rule, the British authorities designated the Mong Circle in 1871, to encompass an ethnically mixed population in the Feni valley. In 1881, the Chittagong Hill Tracts were administratively divided into three circles, namely the Chakma Circle, the Bohmong Circle, and the Mong Circles, each presided over by a hereditary chief from the Chakma and Marma peoples. The circles were codified into law with the Chittagong Hill Tract Regulations, 1900, eased revenue collection and administrative burdens on British authorities by delegating tax collection, land administration management and social arbitration responsibilities to the chieftains. In 1901, the Mong Circle extended . This administrative structure remained in place until 1964, when the introduction of local self-government abolished the special status of these circles and brought local administration under the control of the central government.

See also 
 Marma people
 Bohmong Circle
 Chakma Circle

References 

Khagrachhari District
Dynasties of Bengal
Subdivisions of British India
Quasi-princely estates of India
Lands inhabited by indigenous peoples
History of Chittagong Division
Bangladeshi families
Chakma people